FPB may refer to:

 FPB (band), a Czech punk rock band
 FPB-TV, an American television station
 Fast patrol boat
 Federal Planning Bureau of Belgium
 Federation of Trade Unions of Belarus
 Fibrinopeptide B, a compound in coagulation
 Film and Publication Board, in South Africa
 First Pacific Bank, a Hong Kong bank
 First Premier Bank
 Popular Forces of Burundi, a Congolese rebel group
 Forum of Private Business, in the United Kingdom
 Progressive Citizens' Party in Liechtenstein
 Four-point flexural test, Four Point Bending test in mechanical characterization
 Femoral Popliteal Bypass surgery, a type of surgery